The expansion of Flossenbürg concentration camp led to the establishment of subcamps, the first of which was established at Stulln in February 1942 to provide forced labor to a mining company. Many of them were located in the Sudetenland or across the border in the Protectorate of Bohemia and Moravia. The vast majority were established after 1 March 1944. Initially, the subcamps were not involved in armaments production, which changed in the second half of 1944 due to a large influx of available prisoners and the activities of the Jägerstab, which sought to increase German aircraft production. The Jägerstab'''s dispersal of aircraft production spurred the expansion of the subcamp system in 1944 and resulted in the establishment of the two largest of the subcamps, at Hersbruck and Leitmeritz. In the second half of 1944, 45 new camps were created, compared to three camps in the previous six months. The staffing these new camps was increasingly filled by Luftwaffe soldiers, Volksdeutsche'' SS men (ethnic Germans from outside the Reich), and SS women, for the subcamps containing female prisoners. By April 1945, 80% of the prisoners were at the subcamps. Of all the concentration camp systems, Flossenbürg's subcamp system was one of the three most important to the economy of Nazi Germany, along with Dachau's and Mauthausen's. 

List of subcamps

References

Citations

Encyclopedia of Camps and Ghettos

Other

Further reading

 
Flossenburg
Subcamps of Nazi concentration camps